Morell-Donagh is a provincial electoral district for the Legislative Assembly of Prince Edward Island, Canada. The district was contested for the first time in the 2019 Prince Edward Island general election.

Members
The riding has elected the following Members of the Legislative Assembly:

Election results

Morell-Donagh, 2019–present

References

Prince Edward Island provincial electoral districts